The 1999–2000 Santosh Trophy was the 56th edition of the Santosh Trophy, the main State competition for football in India. It was held from 9 to 23 April 2000 in Thrissur and Chalakudy, Kerala. Twenty-eight teams from all over the country were supposed to take part in the national state championships, but six pulled out. Maharashtra beat the home team of Kerala 1–0 in the final.

Qualified teams

The following eight teams qualified for the Santosh Trophy proper.

 Goa
 Kerala
 Karnataka
 Maharashtra
 Punjab
 Services
 Tamil Nadu
 Bengal

Group stage

Group X

Group Y

Knockout stage

Bracket

Semi-finals

Third place play-off

Final

Statistics

Goalscorers
9 goals
 Mohammed Najeeb (Maharashtra)

Awards
 Fair Play Trophy: Kerala
 Man of Tournament: Aqueel Ansari (Maharashtra)
 Best Goalkeeper: Virender Singh (Maharashtra)
 Best Defender: Jo Paul Ancheri (Kerala)
 Best Midfielder: Khalid Jamil (Maharashtra)
 Best Striker: Sylvester Ignatius (Kerala)

References
 

 
1999–2000 in Indian football